LanSchool is a classroom management software owned by Lenovo and focused on school environments. The company is based in Research Triangle Park, North Carolina, and was founded as LanFan Technologies in February 1986. Two versions of the software are available: LanSchool Classic, the locally hosted version, and LanSchool Air, the cloud-based version. Both versions enable teachers to monitor students’ screens while in class, limit the websites students may visit, “push” a website to open on all classroom devices, and message the class.

Technology 
LanSchool's software uses a proprietary remote desktop protocol that communicates over a local area network. An application is installed on the teacher's computer, which communicates peer-to-peer with a software agent running on pupils' computers. Lanschool can function on most computer systems.

History 

Originally named LanFan Technologies, the company was founded in February 1986. Dana Doggett began exploring the concept of a software application that would allow an instructor to control multiple computers.

Doggett developed a software tool called PC Chalkboard that was then implemented by Novell. PC Chalkboard allowed Novell lab instructors to broadcast their screens to each PC in the lab. LanSchool was licensed by both Intel and IBM and actively marketed through each company's education sales channel. In April 2001, Doggett left Intel and formed another company, LanSchool Technologies, LLC, where he could work on LanSchool full-time.

Acquisitions
LanSchool was acquired by Stoneware in 2011. In September 2012, Lenovo announced the acquisition of Stoneware which was completed on December 26, 2012.

Security 
There have been cases of students being able to exploit the LanSchool software to bypass restrictions, and in some cases take control of other student computers. A 2006 post on CompSci.ca details the packet structure of older versions of the software, and claims there was no encryption or similar precautions. This issue was confirmed to have been caught and fixed in the same post the following year.

Features 
 
The program has multiple features, including thumbnail view, whitelisting and blacklisting websites, keystroke monitoring and screen broadcasting. The program also allows the teacher to access the camera and microphone, as well as internet history.

See also
Employee monitoring software
Computer surveillance
Computer Lab

References

Educational software
Remote administration software
Surveillance